John Ross Thompson (10 May 1918 – 15 June 2010) was an English amateur cricketer, rackets player and schoolteacher.

Life and career
Thompson was born in Berkhamsted, Hertfordshire, and was educated at Tonbridge School in Kent and at St John's College, Cambridge. A right-handed batsman, he was regarded as a potential Test player during his two years in the Cambridge University team in 1938 and 1939, Wisden remarking that he batted in "very correct style" with "the makings of a brilliant batsman". However, World War II intervened, and after the war he concentrated on his career as a mathematics and physics teacher at Marlborough College, appearing occasionally for Warwickshire during the school holidays. In 1949, after playing his first match in mid-August, he scored 609 runs in first-class cricket at an average of 60.90, putting him sixth in the national averages. 

He played 36 matches of Minor Counties cricket with Wiltshire from 1955 to 1963. He toured Canada in 1951 and North America in 1959 with the Marylebone Cricket Club, tours that coincided with the English school holidays; he also managed the 1959 tour.

Thompson was also a champion rackets player, winning the British amateur singles title five times and the doubles title 11 times. He also played squash for England. At Marlborough, as well as teaching mathematics and physics, he was master in charge of rackets and cricket, and a housemaster.

References

External links
 

1918 births
2010 deaths
People from Berkhamsted
People educated at Tonbridge School
Alumni of St John's College, Cambridge
English cricketers
Cambridge University cricketers
Marylebone Cricket Club cricketers
Warwickshire cricketers
Wiltshire cricketers
Schoolteachers from Hertfordshire
English male squash players
English racquets players